Kandi & The Gang is an American reality television series that premiered on Bravo on March 6, 2022. Developed as a spin-off of The Real Housewives of Atlanta, it has aired one season and features Kandi Burruss and the staff at her Atlanta restaurant Old Lady Gang.

The series follows Burruss and her husband Todd Tucker, with the staff as they revitalize the restaurant while juggling their existing careers and personal lives.

Cast

Main cast
 Kandi Burruss
 Bertha Jones
 Joyce Jones
 Nora Wilcox
 Todd Tucker

Supporting cast
 Brandon Black
 DonJuan Clark
 Patrick Dallas
 Phillip Frempong
 Melvin Jones
 Torin Mitchell
 Brian Redmond
 Shawndreca Robinson
 Rashard Roles
 Dom'Unique Variety

Episodes

References

2020s American reality television series
2022 American television series debuts
English-language television shows
Bravo (American TV network) original programming
The Real Housewives spin-offs
Television shows set in Atlanta
American television spin-offs
Reality television spin-offs
Television series by Endemol